Fernhill may refer to:

Places

Australia
Fernhill, Bowenfels, a heritage-listed residence and farmland located near Lithgow, New South Wales
Fernhill, Mulgoa, a residence and surrounding estate located on the western outskirts of Sydney, New South Wales
Fernhill, New South Wales, a suburb of Wollongong

Canada
Fernhill Cemetery, located in Saint John, New Brunswick

India
The Fernhills Palace, Ooty, the former erstwhile summer residence of the Maharaja of Mysore

Great Britain
Fernhill, South Lanarkshire, area of Rutherglen, Scotland
Fernhill, Rhondda Cynon Taf, village near Mountain Ash, Wales
Fernhill railway station, serving the village of Fernhill in the Cynon Valley, Wales
Fernhill, West Sussex, hamlet within the borough of Crawley (but formerly in Surrey)
Fernhill Heath, village in Worcestershire
Fernhill Heath railway station, former intermediate railway station on the Oxford, Worcester and Wolverhampton Railway
Fernhill Park, a landed estate in Winkfield, Berkshire

New Zealand
Fernhill Branch, railway line in Otago
Fernhill, Dunedin, an inner suburb of Dunedin, Otago
Fernhill, Hawke's Bay, a town in the North Island
Fernhill, Queenstown, a suburb of Queenstown, Otago

United States 
 Fernhill Park, a city park in Northeast Portland, Oregon
 Fern Hill, Tacoma, Washington

Other
 Fernhill (band), Welsh folk band
 Fernhill School (disambiguation)
 "Fern Hill", a poem